Susana Hurtado Vallejo (born 14 January 1963) is a Mexican politician from the Institutional Revolutionary Party. From 2010 to 2012 she served as Deputy of the LXI Legislature of the Mexican Congress representing Quintana Roo.

References

1963 births
Living people
Politicians from Mexico City
Institutional Revolutionary Party politicians
National Autonomous University of Mexico alumni
21st-century Mexican politicians
21st-century Mexican women politicians
Women members of the Chamber of Deputies (Mexico)
Deputies of the LXI Legislature of Mexico
Members of the Chamber of Deputies (Mexico) for Quintana Roo